Meistrich is a surname. Notable people with the surname include:

 Donna Meistrich (born 1954), American artist
 Larry Meistrich (born 1966), American film producer